Route 266 is a section of former U.S. Route 66 (US 66) with termini between Interstate 44 (I-44) at Springfield and Route 96 west of Halltown.

Route description 
At Halltown, the Route meets Route Z. In , Route 266 deviates from old Route 66 in a project to improve access to Springfield-Branson Regional Airport. For , the route follows the new roadway. At the Partial cloverleaf interchange at Interstate 44, the road continues as Interstate 44 Business.

History
Route 266 was originally assigned to a new expressway built through downtown Springfield (specifically, Chestnut Expressway between College Street and Glenstone Avenue).  As Interstate 44 was constructed, and US 66 was assigned concurrently with it, the now former US 66 from Springfield to Route 96 was added to Route 266.  The westernmost section (which passed through Paris Springs Junction and Spencer) would be turned into county roads.  Eventually, Chestnut Expressway would be designated Interstate 44 Business, and Route 266 would have its current route.

Major intersections

References

266
266
Transportation in Lawrence County, Missouri
Transportation in Greene County, Missouri
Transportation in Springfield, Missouri